Priapella is a genus of poeciliid fish endemic to fresh water habitats in southern Mexico.

Species
There are currently six recognized species in this genus:
 Priapella bonita (Meek, 1904) (Graceful priapella)
 Priapella chamulae Schartl, M. K. Meyer & B. Wilde, 2006
 Priapella compressa Álvarez, 1948 (Palenque priapella)
 Priapella intermedia Álvarez & Carranza, 1952 (Isthmian priapella)
 Priapella lacandonae M. K. Meyer, Schories & Schartl, 2011
 Priapella olmecae M. K. Meyer & Espinoza-Pérez, 1990 (Olmec priapella)

References 

 
Poeciliidae
Freshwater fish of Mexico
Freshwater fish genera
Taxa named by Charles Tate Regan
Ray-finned fish genera
Taxonomy articles created by Polbot